Eucyrtops is a genus of Australian armored trapdoor spiders that was first described by Reginald Innes Pocock in 1897.  it contains only 3 species: E. eremaeus, E. ksenijae and E. latior.

See also
 List of Idiopidae species

References

External links

Idiopidae
Mygalomorphae genera
Spiders of Australia
Taxa named by R. I. Pocock